Dolores (Dody) Crane is a Canadian politician, who was interim leader of the Prince Edward Island New Democratic Party from 1989 to 1991. She originally ran as the party's candidate in Hillsborough in the 1988 federal election, finishing with what was at the time the best federal result for an NDP candidate in the province's history. Due to organizational upheaval in the provincial party following the resignation of Jim Mayne, she subsequently served as the party's spokesperson and acting leader until Larry Duchesne was selected as the party's new permanent leader in 1991.

She continued to be a New Democratic Party candidate in federal elections, running in Hillsborough again in the 1993, 1997 and 2000 elections, and in the successor riding of Charlottetown in the 2004 election.

She is the sister of Olive Crane, a former MLA and leader of the Prince Edward Island Progressive Conservative Party.

Electoral record

References

Living people
New Democratic Party of Prince Edward Island leaders
Women in Prince Edward Island politics
Female Canadian political party leaders
New Democratic Party candidates for the Canadian House of Commons
People from Charlottetown
Prince Edward Island candidates for Member of Parliament
21st-century Canadian women politicians
20th-century Canadian women politicians
Year of birth missing (living people)